Mercuria Energy Group Ltd is a Cypriot-domiciled multinational commodity trading company active in a wide spectrum of global energy markets including crude oil and refined petroleum products, natural gas (including LNG), power, biodiesel, base metals and agricultural products. The company is one of the world's five largest independent energy traders and asset operators and is based in Geneva, Switzerland, with 37 additional offices worldwide. The group operates in 50 different countries.

Mercuria was started in 2004 by Marco Dunand and Daniel Jaeggi, then executives at Phibro, the commodities trader sold by Citigroup to Occidental Petroleum in 2009. The company focused mostly on oil trading until 2007. Prior to this, Mercuria was assumed control of J&S Group, which was named after the Polish businessmen Gregory Jankilevitsch and Wiaczeslaw Smolokowski. They and their affiliates joined as founders of Mercuria, and they remain as shareholders today.

Operations 

Its subsidiaries include Navitas Energy in Canada and Vesta Terminal Services in Europe, which operates port logistics, storage and processing facilities in the Netherlands, Estonia, Belgium, and Germany. Mercuria, the former owner of Vesta Terminal, entered into a joint venture with Sinopec by selling 50% of the terminals in 2013. 

Mercuria is active players in energy and renewable markets through investments in the energy transition, with a particular focus on the United States and Europe. The company tells Bloomberg half of its portfolio will be in renewables in the next five years,  and has already committed to invest over $2 billion into the energy transition.

History 
As the company expanded, it has hired traders and investment professionals from Morgan Stanley, Goldman Sachs, Louis Dreyfus Group and Electrabel in London. In November 2010, Mercuria Energy bought MGM International Group from Morgan Stanley Capital Group Inc. and MGM International LLC. The Miami, Florida-based MGM International Group is a developer of international projects to reduce greenhouse gas emissions.

In 2014, Mercuria bought part of JPMorgan's physical commodities trading business for a reported US$3.5 billion. Magid Shenouda, the former co-head of commodities trading at Goldman Sachs Group Inc, joined Mercuria as a shareholder, global head of trading and deputy CEO.

In January 2016, Mercuria announced that ChemChina had bought a 12% stake in the company. Mercuria also acquired the reorganized Aegean Marine which was renamed Minerva Bunkering.

In 2019, Mercuria acquired bankrupt Aegean Marine Petroleum Network Inc and restructured the company to operate as Minerva Bunkering, a leading global physical supplier of marine fuels and a fully-owned subsidiary of Mercuria Energy Group Limited.

In 2020, Mercuria had its best year ever, earning $786 million with revenues in line with commodity prices to about $85 billion. The company's gross profit on sales for the year was $1.86 billion.

In 2021, Mercuria bought the clean energy specialist Beyond6 from HC2Holdings for $169 million. In November 2022, it was announced Beyond6 has been acquired by the Chevron Corporation subsidiary, Chevron USA Inc.

Subsidiaries 

 Mercuria Commodities Canada Corporation
 Minerva Bunkering
 Mercuria Energy Netherlands B.V.
 Unico Investments B.V.
 Mercuria Energy Group Holding
 Mercuria Investments US
 Mercuria Energy Asset Management B.V.
 Mercuria (China) Metal Resources Co Ltd
 J.P. Morgan Energy Europe Ltd
 Upstream Capital Partners VI Limited
 AU Energy B.V.
 Mercuria Energy Group Holding SA
 Mercuria UK Llp

Further reading

References

External links
 Mercuria Energy Website

Oil and gas companies of Switzerland
Oil traders
Swiss companies established in 2004
Non-renewable resource companies established in 2004
Multinational companies headquartered in Cyprus
Oil and gas companies of Cyprus